Down to Earth is the debut album by American organist Freddie Roach recorded in 1962 and released on the Blue Note label.

Reception

The Allmusic review by Stephen Thomas Erlewine awarded the album 4½ stars and stated "Freddie Roach differentiated himself from the legions of soul-jazz organists on his debut album, Down to Earth. Many jazz organists played the instrument down and dirty, and while there's funk in Roach's playing, his style is ultimately lighter than many of his peers, with clean, concise solos and chords... the signature of Down to Earth is Roach's tasteful bluesy grooves, which prove to be just as entertaining as the hotter styles of his Blue Note peers Jimmy Smith and John Patton".

Track listing
All compositions by Freddie Roach
 "De Bug" - 6:46
 "Ahm Miz" - 5:53
 "Lujan" - 6:33
 "Althea Soon" - 8:11
 "More Mileage" - 6:39
 "Lion Down" - 4:55

Personnel
Freddie Roach - organ
Percy France - tenor saxophone
Kenny Burrell - guitar
Clarence Johnston - drums

References

Blue Note Records albums
Freddie Roach (organist) albums
1962 debut albums
Albums produced by Alfred Lion
Albums recorded at Van Gelder Studio